

Events

Births

Deaths
 Kolbeinn Tumason (born 1173), Icelandic, dies following the Battle of Víðines, composing Heyr himna smiður (Hear, Heavenly Creator) on his deathbed
 Guiot de Provins died sometime after 1208 (born unknown), French poet and Trouvère

13th-century poetry
Poetry